The 1951 SFR Yugoslavia Chess Championship was the 7th edition of SFR Yugoslav Chess Championship. Held in Sarajevo, SFR Yugoslavia, SR Bosnia & Herzegovina. The tournament was won by Braslav Rabar.

Table and results

References 

Yugoslav Chess Championships
1951 in chess
Chess